Agglestone Rock, also known as the Devil's Anvil, is a sandstone block of about 400 tonnes weight, perched on a conical hill, approximately  from the village of Studland, south Dorset. Formerly an 'anvil' shape with a flat top, it fell onto one end and side in 1970, leaving the top at an angle of approximately 45°. 

Legend has it that the devil threw the rock from The Needles on the Isle of Wight with the intention of hitting either Corfe Castle, Bindon Abbey or Salisbury Cathedral. "Aggle" was taken into the old Dorset dialect as meaning "to wobble".

Geology
The rock is an "eroded relic of iron-cemented, Tertiary sandstone, the Agglestone Grit". It used to be anvil-shaped, but has since changed form due to erosion and been toppled.

Visiting the rock was listed by the Dorset Echo as one of the "25 Things To Do In Dorset Before You Die".

Mythology
In his 1927 book Downland Man, H.J. Massingham wrote:

References

Landforms of Dorset
Rock formations of England